The Kumajaba Pass is situated in the Eastern Cape province of South Africa, near the small town of Maclear.

Its coordinates are

References

Mountain passes of the Eastern Cape